Jomo Wilson (born September 22, 1983) is an American football wide receiver who is currently a free agent. He played for the University of Toledo before transferring to Eastern Oregon University. He was signed as an undrafted free agent by the Central Valley Coyotes in 2007. In 2009, Wilson signed with the Boise Burn. He then moved on to the Jacksonville Sharks where he played for two years, 2010 and 2011. In 2011, Jomo hauled in 131 receptions for 1737 yards and 44 touchdowns, helping his team win ArenaBowl XXIV.

College career
Wilson attended the University of Toledo before transferring to San Joaquin Delta College. Upon completing his degree at San Joaquin Delta, Wilson continued his football career at Eastern Oregon University.

Professional career
Wilson has been good friends with Aaron Garcia during his time in the Arena Football League. On April 14, 2014, Wilson was traded by to the Sharks for future considerations. On March 14, 2015, Wilson was traded, along with Nyere Aumaitre and Undra Hendrix, for Derrick Ross,

References

External links
 San Antonio Talons Bio
 Jacksonville Sharks Bio

1983 births
Sportspeople from Peoria, Illinois
Players of American football from Illinois
Living people
American football wide receivers
American football defensive backs
Toledo Rockets football players
Eastern Oregon Mountaineers football players
Central Valley Coyotes players
Boise Burn players
Jacksonville Sharks players
San Antonio Talons players
San Joaquin Delta College alumni
Delta College Mustangs football players
Las Vegas Outlaws (arena football) players